Andy Moran (born 2 November 1983) is an Irish Gaelic football manager and former player for Ballaghaderreen and the Mayo county team.

He made his 150th league and championship appearance for Mayo in June 2017, his 13th season.

Playing career
Although Ballaghaderreen town was transferred from County Mayo to County Roscommon under the Local Government (Ireland) Act 1898, the GAA club competes in Mayo and many of its players declare for that county. As in this case, Moran chose to play for Mayo, this decision has been received negatively from Roscommon GAA supporters. Although, Roscommon GAA  condemned fans who booed Moran in a 2017 All-Ireland quarter-final match against Mayo.

In 2011, Moran won his first All Star award, being named at full forward on the team.

In 2012, Moran, a former vice-captain, was named captain of the Mayo senior team. He then injured himself in the 53rd minute of the All-Ireland Senior Football Championship quarter-final defeat of Down, having to be stretchered off the field of play and left lying on a medical trolley in the tunnel of Croke Park with ice strapped to his knee. As a result, he missed the rest of the season, including the 2012 All-Ireland Senior Football Championship Final against Donegal, after undergoing surgery on his torn cruciate knee ligament. he returned against Galway in the 2013 Connacht quarter final and scored as Mayo won 4-16 1-11 points. He was the highest scoring Mayo forward in the 2013 All-Ireland, playing a captain's part.
Moran was starting against Dublin in the All-Ireland final in 2016, but his team was defeated by a one-point margin. Coincidentally the following year Mayo lost again against Dublin in the 2017 All-Ireland final by another one-point margin.

Moran ended up as an All-Ireland runner-up on six occasions. In 2017, he was awarded his second All Star Award and Footballer of the Year for the first time.

He played his last game for Ballaghaderreen at the age of 38 on 1 October 2022, scoring a hat-trick of goals and points (3–3) in a 6–8 to 2–8 win against Davitts.

Management career
Moran help Mayo U20's in a coaching capacity in 2020 before taking over his native Ballaghaderreen along with Mike Solan ahead of the 2021 season. In October 2021, it was announced that Andy Moran would be the Leitrim senior football manager, taking over from Terry Hyland who stepped down following the 2021 Connacht Senior Football Championship semi-final vs Mayo. Moran's first win with Leitrim was vs Tipperary in Round 2 of the 2022 National Football League.

Media career
Moran has done broadcasting duties for eir Sport.

Personal life
Moran is a supporter of the association football team Tottenham.

Honours
 Connacht Senior Football Championship (8): 2004, 2006, 2009, 2011, 2012, 2013, 2014, 2015
 National Football League (1): 2019
 Sigerson Cup (3): 2004–2005, 2008
 Connacht Under-21 Football Championship (2): 2003–2004
 Connacht Minor Football Championship (2): 2000–2001
 Mayo Senior Football Championship (2): 2008, 2012
 All Star (2): 2011, 2017
 Footballer of the Year (1): 2017
 All-Ireland Senior Football Championship: Runner-Up (6): 2004, 2006, 2012–2013, 2016–2017

References

1983 births
Living people
Alumni of the Institute of Technology, Sligo
Connacht inter-provincial Gaelic footballers
Gaelic football forwards
Gaelic football managers
Gaelic games writers and broadcasters
Mayo inter-county Gaelic footballers
People from Castlebar